Bonnetia chimantensis is a species of flowering plant in the Bonnetiaceae family. It is found only in Venezuela, occurring in the Canaima National Park, where mining and tourism are threatening habitats at lower elevations.

References

Endemic flora of Venezuela
Vulnerable plants
chimantensis
Taxonomy articles created by Polbot